Devario shanensis is a small, freshwater fish of the family Cyprinidae found in the Irrawaddy and Salween River basins.

References

External links
 Devario shanensis

Devario
Fish described in 1928